State Road 758 (SR 758) is an  state road in Sarasota, Florida, United States. State Road 758 is locally known as Bee Ridge Road from Tamiami Trail (US 41-SR 45) east to its eastern terminus at Interstate 75 (SR 93) where it continues east as a county road.

Route description

SR 758 begins at an intersection with US 41/SR 45. Upon crossing US 41/SR 45, the road widens into a seven-lane road with a center left-turn lane. The road passes through a mix of homes and businesses, intersecting South Shade Avenue before crossing Phillippi Creek. The state road heads east through more developed areas, crossing South Tuttle Avenue/Swift Road, South Lockwood Ridge Road, Beneva Road, and Sawyer Road. The road crosses the former Seminole Gulf Railway line (Legacy Trail) and intersects McIntosh Road, where just east of that at Bond Place it becomes a four-laned divided highway. Then it crosses Honore Avenue, and just before it intersects with Cattlemen Road it becomes a six-laned divided highway as it continues through areas of residential neighborhoods and businesses. SR 758 reaches its eastern terminus slightly east of an interchange with I-75/SR 93 in Bee Ridge, with the unnumbered Bee Ridge Road continuing to the east as a four-lane divided road until an intersection with Mauna Loa Boulevard.

History
In 2018, Sarasota County accepted the state’s $40 million offer to swap responsibility for several roads (i.e. road swap) in exchange for the state to perform major improvements on River Road, one of the county’s main thoroughfares and vital evacuation routes. FDOT handed over the responsibility of a portion of State Road 758, known locally as Siesta Drive and Midnight Pass Road, west of US 41. The county will be responsible for ongoing maintenance of those roadways, although the state would still maintain the bridges to Siesta Key. The road transfer was completed in September 2020.

Major intersections

Bridges

Siesta Key Bridge 
The Siesta Key Bridge (also called the Sarasota Bay Bridge) is a double-leaf bascule bridge that crosses the Roberts Bay, connecting the barrier islands of Siesta Key and the mainland of Sarasota, Florida. The bascule bridge carries Siesta Drive, part of SR 758. It was built in 1972, replacing the original swing bridge built in 1926.

References

External links

758
758
Sarasota, Florida